Once Upon a Time There Was a Singing Blackbird (Georgian: იყო შაშვი მგალობელი (Iko shashvi mgalobeli)) is a 1970 Soviet comedy-drama film.

Plot
Gia is a percussionist with an orchestra in Tbilisi.  He still lives with his mother.  He occasionally finds time to talk to people, but it never lasts and he always has to hurry back to the orchestra.

Cast
Gela Kandelaki as  Gia Agladze
Gogi Chkheidze
Jansug Kakhidze as  Conductor
Medea Japaridze

References

External links
 
 Genis Памятник Дрозду. // Novaya Gazeta (2008)

1970 comedy-drama films
Soviet comedy-drama films
Kartuli Pilmi films
1970 films
Films directed by Otar Iosseliani
Soviet-era films from Georgia (country)